"Midnight" is the tenth episode of the fourth series of the British science fiction television series Doctor Who. It was first broadcast on BBC One on 14 June 2008.

The episode is principally set on board a small touring vehicle, which stops in the middle of a tour on the hostile surface of the planet Midnight and has its cockpit destroyed with its driver and mechanic. The unseen assailant is depicted only through sound effects and its possession of one of the vehicle's passengers, Sky Silvestry (Lesley Sharp), who repeats the words of the other passengers on board.

The episode placed much more emphasis on the role of David Tennant as the Tenth Doctor than in the rest of the fourth series, with the Doctor's companion, Donna Noble (played by Catherine Tate) playing only a minimal role. For this reason Stephen James Walker has described this episode in his book Monsters Within as being "companion-lite".

Plot

The Tenth Doctor and Donna visit the resort planet Midnight, the surface of which is bathed in lethal radiation from its star. The Doctor takes a shuttle tour to visit a waterfall made of sapphires. He goes alone as he is unable to convince Donna to leave the comfort of the local spa.

Mid-route, the shuttle unexpectedly stops; the Doctor joins Driver Joe and Mechanic Claude in the cockpit and they see all systems appear operational but they are simply not moving. The Doctor asks Joe to briefly open the cockpit radiation shielding to see what may be causing the problem, and before they are forced to close them again, Claude claims to have seen something moving outside. Joe calls in for a rescue shuttle, but it will take some time to arrive.

The Doctor returns to the cabin, as he, the hostess, and other passengers hear knocking on the sides of the shuttle. The knocking seems to follow their movements, but soon comes from the same side of the shuttle where one passenger, Sky, is cowering. When the shuttle is rocked violently, the hostess goes to check in with Joe and Claude, only to find the cockpit has been ripped from the shuttle. The Doctor and other passengers see Sky behaving oddly, repeating what they are saying, frightening the passengers who think she has become possessed by whatever was outside. Sky begins talking simultaneously with the passengers, increasing the paranoia among the group. They begin to debate throwing Sky out onto the surface of the planet which after the Doctor's objection leads to them threatening to throw him out as well. Sky then begins only repeating what the Doctor says.

As the Doctor converses with Sky, she starts saying things before the Doctor repeats them, making the other passengers believe the entity has moved on to possess the Doctor. Sky attempts to convince the passengers she is back to normal, and that they must throw the Doctor off the shuttle. While most of the other passengers start to pull the Doctor towards the shuttle door, the hostess, hearing Sky use some of the Doctor's unusual phrases, realises Sky is still possessed. The hostess pulls herself and Sky out of the cabin and into the radiation. The shuttle passengers are rescued and returned to the resort.

Continuity
Dee Dee tells the Doctor that she has written a paper on the lost moon of Poosh. The Doctor also mentions the Medusa Cascade, and Rose Tyler appears briefly on a television screen. These are all references to the series 4 story arc. Rose appears along with the missing planets, including Poosh, in the two-part season finale "The Stolen Earth"/"Journey's End".

Production
"Midnight" is the fiftieth episode filmed for the revived series, and was filmed at the same time as "Turn Left". Donna has a minor role in the episode (appearing in only the pre-credits sequence and the final scene), while the Doctor has a minor role in "Turn Left".

Russell T Davies has stated that "Midnight" was inspired by the Star Trek: The Next Generation episode "Darmok".

Cast notes
David Troughton, cast here as Professor Hobbes, was a late replacement for Sam Kelly, who broke his leg and had to withdraw from the production. Troughton joined the rest of the cast in Cardiff with just two days notice. Now known for his stage work with the RSC as well as television, he is the son of Patrick Troughton, who portrayed the Second Doctor. He has had long association with the series since the 1960s, appearing as an uncredited extra in the Second Doctor serial The Enemy of the World, as Private Moor in the Second Doctor serial The War Games, and as King Peladon in the Third Doctor serial The Curse of Peladon. He has appeared in the Doctor Who audio dramas Cuddlesome, The Judgement of Isskar, The Destroyer of Delights, and The Chaos Pool. He is unrelated to the director of the episode, Alice Troughton.

Daniel Ryan (Biff Kane) had announced in a 2006 interview that he was going to ask Russell T Davies for a role in Doctor Who, as he wanted his children to see him acting on television in a programme that was not inaccessible. Ryan had a supporting role in the Davies created series Bob & Rose (starring Lesley Sharp), and Davies had previously written an episode of Linda Green which Ryan starred in.

Cultural references
Dee Dee Blasco quotes, and the Doctor references, Christina Rossetti's poem "Goblin Market," excerpting the famous lines:
"We must not look at goblin men,
We must not buy their fruits:
Who knows upon what soil they fed
Their hungry thirsty roots?"

The song that plays on the shuttle's entertainment system is "Do It, Do It Again", by Raffaella Carrà.

Broadcast and reception
"Midnight" was watched by 8.05 million viewers, a 38% share of the total television audience, making it the fifth most-watched programme of the week.  The episode received an Appreciation Index score of 86 (considered Excellent).

The episode received a number of reviews in British national newspapers. The Guardians TV reviewer Sam Wollaston described the episode as "great... it's tense and claustrophobic, and gnaws away at you." He praised the fact that all the action happened in one confined space with an unseen enemy, saying "this is psychological drama rather than full-blown horror; creepy-unknown scary, not special-effect-monster scary." William Gallagher of Radio Times was generally positive about the episode, but he said he would have "liked just a beat more, just a tiny further step before the resolution; can't even tell you what was missing but I needed one more stage in the journey". The Timess reviewer Andrew Billen noted that Davies had chosen to forgo special effects and chases in favour of dialogue, but that it "felt too much of a writing exercise to be really scary" and was an example of how the 2008 series "fails as often as it succeeds". Billen praised the episode for its claustrophobic atmosphere and for showing the series was not "afraid of variety," but instead "dead scared of repetition".

IGN's Travis Fickett rated the episode 8.6 out of 10, commenting that it was "a nice change of pace" from the more complex and emotional two-parter that preceded it. He thought the most successful aspect of the episode was the creature and praised the fact that it was "tightly written" and allowed the viewer to get to know the different passengers. In 2010, Matt Wales listed "Midnight" as the second-best Tennant episode of the series in an IGN article. Sam McPherson of Zap2it listed it as the third-best Tenth Doctor episode.

Legacy
The episode was adapted into a stage play, Doctor Who's Midnight.

References

External links

Shooting Script for "Midnight"

Midnight
2008 British television episodes
Midnight
Television episodes about spirit possession
Fiction about body swapping